The discography of the Descendents, a punk rock band formed in Manhattan Beach, California in 1977, consists of eight studio albums, three live albums, three compilation albums, three EPs, several singles, and four music videos.

The Descendents' initial lineup of Frank Navetta (guitar), Tony Lombardo (bass guitar), and Bill Stevenson (drums) released the band's first single, "Ride the Wild" / "It's a Hectic World" in 1980. Adding singer Milo Aukerman, they next released the Fat EP in 1981 and their debut album Milo Goes to College in 1982 through SST Records. The band took a hiatus during Aukerman's collegiate studies, reconvening in 1985 for I Don't Want to Grow Up with guitarist Ray Cooper replacing Navetta. That same year New Alliance issued the compilation Bonus Fat, combining the Fat EP with the band's first single. Doug Carrion had replaced Lombardo by 1986's Enjoy!, but both he and Cooper soon left the band and were replaced by Karl Alvarez and Stephen Egerton, respectively.

In 1987 New Alliance was absorbed by SST Records, who reissued the Descendents' previous material and released their fourth album, All. Aukerman then departed the Descendents to pursue a career in biochemistry. Stevenson, Egerton, and Alvarez changed the name of the band to All, releasing eight albums between 1988 and 1995 with singers Dave Smalley, Scott Reynolds, and Chad Price. Following the Descendents' breakup, SST released the live albums Liveage! (1987) and Hallraker: Live! (1989) and the compilation albums Two Things at Once (1988) and Somery (1991).

Aukerman continued to contribute occasional songwriting and backing vocals to All following his departure from the Descendents, and in 1995 decided to return to music. The band members decided to operate simultaneously as two bands, performing with Aukerman as the Descendents and with Price as All. Both bands signed to Epitaph Records, with the Descendents releasing Everything Sucks in 1996. It became their first album to chart, reaching #132 on the Billboard 200, and was supported by singles and music videos for "I'm the One" and "When I Get Old". The Descendents took another hiatus while Aukerman returned to his biochemistry career, and All released two more studio albums in 1998 and 1999. In 2001 Epitaph released Live Plus One, a double live album with one disc by All and the other by the Descendents, which reached #45 on Billboard's Top Independent Albums chart. The Descendents reconvened for 2004's Cool to Be You, released by Fat Wreck Chords, which reached #143 on the Billboard 200 and #6 amongst independent albums.

Studio albums

Live albums

Compilation albums

EPs

Singles

Music videos

Other appearances 
The following Descendents songs were released on compilation albums, soundtracks, and other releases. This is not an exhaustive list; songs that were first released on the band's albums, EPs, or singles are not included.

I "Like the Way I Know" was recorded in June 1982 during the Milo Goes to College sessions but was not released until 2000.

References

Discographies of American artists
Descendents
Pop punk group discographies